What Is It? is a 2005 American surrealist film written, edited, co-produced and directed by Crispin Glover and starring Glover, Fairuza Balk, and Steven C. Stewart.

Background
What Is It? is the first entry in a planned trilogy directed by Glover, followed by It Is Fine! Everything Is Fine. (2007) and continued with It Is Mine.

Synopsis 
The "adventures" of a young man with Down syndrome whose principal interests are snails, salt, a pipe, and how to get home, who is tormented by a hubristic, racist inner psyche.

Production 
Production of the film started in 1996 as a short film that was to be used as a proof of concept for the as of yet unproduced third film in Glover's It trilogy, It Is Mine. After  completing the filming of the initial short, Glover decided to turn it into its own feature film and filmed an additional eight days over two years.

Release 
The film premiered at the 2005 Sundance Film Festival and played at several other film festivals. Aside from this, it has only been shown at independent theatres, typically accompanied by a question-and-answer session, a one-hour dramatic narration of eight different profusely illustrated books as a slideshow, and a meet-and-greet/book signing with Glover.

Reception 
The film had received a 50% approval rating on Rotten Tomatoes based on 10 reviews, with an average rating of 6.2/10.

References

External links 
 
 
 Trailer on YouTube

Films directed by Crispin Glover
2005 directorial debut films
2005 films
American independent films
American avant-garde and experimental films
2000s avant-garde and experimental films
Down syndrome in film
Films about insects
2000s English-language films
2000s American films